Ron Pernick is an American author and the co-founder and managing director of Clean Edge, a developer and publisher of thematic stock indexes tracking clean energy, transportation, water, and the grid.  He is an accomplished market research, publishing, and business development entrepreneur with more than three decades of high-tech experience.

Biography 

At Clean Edge, Ron Pernick has co-authored many reports on emerging green technologies and has worked with multinational companies, government agencies, and investors. Mr. Pernick co-authored the first report to identify the business and financial opportunities of clean technology (Clean Tech: Profits & Potential, 2001) and has since helped to popularize the term and advance the sector. Most recently, at Clean Edge, he had led the design and development of multiple clean-energy and sustainable-infrastructure focused stock indexes with Nasdaq including U.S.-listed clean energy (CELS) and global smart-grid and grid infrastructure (QGRD). He has also taught MBA-level courses at Portland State University and New College, is widely quoted in the media, and is a regular speaker at industry events in the U.S. and abroad.  Earlier, he was involved in two other technology waves, telecommunications in the 80s and the internet in the 90s. 

With Clint Wilder, Pernick is co-author of The Clean Tech Revolution (HarperCollins, 2007) and Clean Tech Nation: How the U.S. Can Lead in the New Global Economy (HarperCollins, 2012).

See also
Renewable energy commercialization

References

External links
Pernick's Energy Blog at seattlepi.com

Living people
Non-fiction environmental writers
Sustainability advocates
People associated with solar power
Year of birth missing (living people)